Prilep is the fourth-largest city in North Macedonia. According to 2021 census results, it has a population of 63,308  and is known as "the city under Marko's Towers" because of its proximity to the towers of Prince Marko.

Name

The name of Prilep appeared first as Πρίλαπος. The old fortress was attached to the rocky hilltop, and its name means “stuck” on the rocks in Old Church Slavonic. It was mentioned by John Skylitzes in relation with Samuel of Bulgaria, who died here in 1014. In other languages is:
 Bulgarian and Serbo-Croatian: Прилеп / Prilep
 
 , or Perlepe
  or Përlepi, or Prilep or Prilepi
 Greek: Prilapos, Πρίλαπος
 Latin: Prilapum

Economy
Prilep is a centre for high-quality tobacco and cigarettes, as well as metal processing, electronics, timber, textiles, and food industries. The city also produces a large quantity of Macedonian Bianco Sivec (pure white marble).

Tobacco is one of Prilep's traditional cash crops and prospers in the Macedonian climate. Many of the world's largest cigarette makers, such as Marlboro, West and Camel use Prilep's tobacco in their cigarettes after it is processed in local factories such as Tutunski kombinat Prilep. A Tobacco Institute is established in the city in order to produce new types of tobacco and it was the first example of applying genetics to agriculture in the Balkans..

A Gentherm production plant is located in Prilep.

Demographics
The overwhelming majority of the city population is Macedonian; the Macedonian population at the last census counted 64,527. There is also a Romani minority, counting some 4,420 inhabitants,most of them living in the neighbourhood of Trizla , also Serbs (310) and Turks (260).

History

In antiquity, the region of Prilep was part of Ancient Pelagonia that was inhabited by the Pelagones, an ancient Greek tribe of Upper Macedonia, who according to Strabo, were Epirote Molossians. The region was annexed to the Macedonian kingdom during the 4th century BC. In September 2007 archeological excavations in Bonče, revealed a tomb of what is believed to be the burial site of a Macedonian ruler dating 4th century BC. Near Prilep, close to the village of Čepigovo, are the ruins of the ancient Macedonian city of Styberra, first a town in Macedonia and later incorporated into the Roman Empire. Styberra, though razed by the Goths in 268, remained partly inhabited.

The town was first mentioned in Greek as Πρίλαπον (Prilapon) in 1014, as the place where Bulgarian Tsar Samuil allegedly had a heart attack upon seeing thousands of his soldiers had been blinded by the Byzantines after the Battle of Kleidion. Byzantium lost it to the Second Bulgarian Empire, but later retook it. Prilep was acquired in 1334 by Serbian King Dušan and after 1365 the town belonged to King Vukašin, co-ruler of Dušan's son, Tzar Stefan Uroš V. After the death of Vukašin in 1371, Prilep was ruled by his son Marko. In 1395 it was incorporated into the Ottoman Empire, of which it remained a part of until 1913, when it was annexed by the Kingdom of Serbia.

Prilep was a major center of the Bulgarian national revival in Western Macedonia in the 19th century. Its bazaar began to develop in the 18th century. One of the largest annual fairs in Macedonia was held in Prilep in the middle of the 19th century. European consulate exhibitions of 1887 estimate the population of Prilep to approximately 6.500 individuals, of which 4.000 were Bulgarians, 2.000 were Turks and the rest were Serbs with Greeks and Aromanians. During the Great Eastern Crisis, the local Bulgarian movement of the day was defeated when armed Bulgarian groups were repelled by the League of Prizren, an Albanian organisation opposing Bulgarian geopolitical aims in areas like Prilep that contained an Albanian population.

In the late 19th and early 20th century, Prilep was part of the Manastir Vilayet of the Ottoman Empire. It was occupied by Bulgaria between 17 November 1915 and 25 September 1918 during World War I. In 1918 Prilep became part of the Kingdom of Serbs, Croats and Slovenes, and from 1929 to 1941 it was part of the Vardar Banovina of the Kingdom of Yugoslavia. On 8 April 1941, just two days after the start of the Axis invasion of Yugoslavia, Prilep was occupied by the German Army, and on 26 April 1941 by the Bulgarian Army. Together with most of Vardar Macedonia, Prilep was annexed by the Kingdom of Bulgaria from 1941 to 1944. After 9 September coup d'etat the commander of the Bulgarian garrison, refused to withdraw and remained in the city with the Yugoslav guerrillas, managing to hold it for 10 days, blocking the movement of the German troops. Afterwards the German Army retook the town. Prilep was definitively taken by communist partisans on 3 November 1944. From 1944 to 1991 the town belonged to the Socialist Federal Republic of Yugoslavia, as part of its constituent Socialist Republic of Macedonia. Since 1991 the town has been part of the Republic of Macedonia.

Culture

 One of the most important institutions in the city is the Institute of Old Slavic Culture.
 An art colony is hosted in the center of Prilep in the Center of Contemporary Visual Arts. The colony was founded in 1957 by the archaeologist Prof. Boshko Babikj, but organized by the initiative of Prof. Babikj and the academic painter Prof. Risto Lozanovski, making it perhaps one of the oldest colonies in southeastern Europe and the oldest one on the Balkans, for sure. It hosts painters and sculptors (working in marble, metal and wood) every year and, periodically, it hosts workshops and symposia for vitrage (glass design), mosaics, photography, graphics and clay, from countries around the world. The collection of sculptures carved in wood was acknowledged as a cultural heritage by the most relevant criticizers and opinion makers. 2007 was the 50th anniversary of the colony.
 Every year in October the International Children's Music Festival "Asterisks" brings together children from all over the world.
 Every year the Professional Theatre Festival of Macedonia, honouring Vojdan Chernodrinski, who was born in village Selci near Struga and Debar.
 The Monastery of Zrze and the Monastery of the Holy Archangel Michael which has 12th and 14th-century frescoes are notable sites of the culture of Prilep.
 Pivofest (Beer fest) is an annual four-day party held in the middle of July that attracts around 200,000 visitors to the city. There are international popular music acts performing nightly on the main stage in the square as well as at the various clubs around town. Pivofest features a growing number of foreign and domestic beers as well as an opportunity for Prilep to showcase its famous barbecue considered the best in North Macedonia.
 Pročka is a centuries-old religious holiday of forgiveness and celebration that in 2001 found an organized manifestation as "Prilep Carnival" and has been a member of the Federation of European Carnival Cities since 2006. Despite the new official name, the festival is still known as Pročka by the locals and is called Pročka in the official tourist guide. The highlight of the festival is the mask parade which runs through the centre of the town and hosts participants from multiple European countries. There is a prize given for the best costume and many of the costumes are elaborate. There are also concerts, parties, and much traditional food during the festival which is held in February.

Language

The dialect of Prilep, forms the basis for the Standard Macedonian. When the Socialist Republic of Macedonia was formed as part of Yugoslavia at the end of the WWII, the Macedonian language was recognized as distinct one. Then the dialects of Prilep, Veles, Bitola and Ohrid were chosen as the basis for the new official language, because of their central position in the  region of Macedonia.

Art and Architecture

The main square in Prilep is called "Alexandria", in honor of Alexander the Great. The reconstruction of the square began in 2005 and it was completed in 2006. The reconstruction cost 700.000 Euros and its investor was the city of Prilep. During the reconstruction the monument of Alexander the Great was erected, among the other things.

Several ancient sites grace Prilep including one at Markovi Kuli, St. Nicola's church from the 13th century, St. Uspenie church in Bogorodica, St. Preobrazenie church and the Tomb of the Unconquered, and a memorial in honour of the victims of fascism located in Prilep's central park. A large Roman necropolis is known there and parts of numerous walls have been found; the settlement was probably the ancient Ceramiae mentioned in the Peutinger Table. Roman remains can also be found near the Varosh monastery, built on the steep slopes of the hill, which was later inhabited by a medieval community. Many early Roman funeral monuments, some with sculpted reliefs of the deceased or of the Thracian Rider and other inscribed monuments of an official nature, are in the courtyard of the church below the southern slope of Varosh. Some of the larger of those monuments were built into the walls of the church.

The most important ancient monument is the old city of Styberra situated on Bedem hill near Čepigovo, in the central region of Pelagonia. As early as the time of the Roman–Macedonian wars, this city was known as a base from which the Macedonian king Perseus of Macedon set out to conquer the Penestian cities. It was a stronghold of the Macedonian kings after it was rebuilt in the early Roman period and was at the Pelagonian entrance to a pass leading to Illyria. Part of the city wall, a gate, and a few buildings of the Roman period were uncovered here in excavations. All recent finds from these sites are in the Museum of the City of Prilep.

Prilep has frescoes from the 14th and 15th centuries and is probably the site of the early Roman town of Kolobaise. The name of the early town is recorded on a long inscription on stone which deals with a local cult of Ephesian Artemis. The inscription was reused as a base for a cross on top of one of the church domes. Other inscriptions at Treskavec include several 1st century Roman dedications to Apollo. The old fortress was used by the Romans, and later the Byzantines. After all, even Tsar Samuil came here after the defeat at Belasica in 1014. During the Middle Ages, after 1371, Prince Marko rebuilt the citadel extensively, making it an important military stronghold.

Geography
Prilep is the seat of the Prilep municipality and access is gained via the A3.

Climate

Sports
Prilep is the home of several sports teams, the best known are:
 ФК Победа 2000-2009
 ФК 11ти Октомври 1999-2011
 ФК Корзо
 ФУДБАЛСКА ЕКИПА ЗА ГЛУВИ ОД ПРИЛЕП
 
 Ракометен Клуб „ПОБЕДА“
 Ракометен Клуб „МЕТАЛОТЕХНИКА“
 Ракометен Клуб „ПЕГАЗ“
 Ракометен Клуб „ТУТУНСКИ КОМБИНАТ“ – МЛАДИНЦИ
 Женски Ракометен Клуб „ТУТУНСКИ КОМБИНАТ“
 Женски Ракометен Клуб „Прилеп“
 Женски Ракометен Клуб „ТУТУНСКИ КОМБИНАТ“ – МЛАДИНЦИКИ
 Ракометен Клуб „ПАРТИЗАН“

 СПОРТСКА САЛА „МАКЕДОНИЈА“
 УНИВЕРЗАЛНА СПОРТСКА САЛА
 ПЛАНИНАРСКИ ДОМ „ДЕРВЕН“

Notable people

Twin towns – sister cities

Prilep Municipality is twinned with:
 Asenovgrad, Bulgaria
 Chernihiv, Ukraine

 Garfield, United States
 Tire, Turkey
 Topoľčany, Slovakia
 Vincent, Australia

References

External links

 Прилеп, Prilep
 Official Prilep Municipality website
 Prilep at the Balkan Info Home website
 "St. Kliment Ohridski" University - Bitola
 Prilep at the Cyber Macedonia website
 "Asterisks": International children's music festival
 Стари фотографии од Прилеп
 Марко Цепенков
 Пеце Атанасоски
 Блаже Конески
Gentherm

 
Cities in North Macedonia